René Just Haüy FRS MWS FRSE (28 February 1743 – 1 June 1822) was a French priest and mineralogist, commonly styled the Abbé Haüy after he was made an honorary canon of Notre Dame.  Due to his innovative work on crystal structure and his four-volume Traité de Minéralogie (1801),
he is often referred to as the "Father of Modern Crystallography". During the French revolution he also helped to establish the metric system.

Biography

Early life 
René-Just Haüy was born at Saint-Just-en-Chaussée on February 28, 1743, in the  province of Île-de-France (later the département of Oise). His parents were Just Haüy, a poor linen-weaver, and his wife Magdeleine Candelot.

Haüy's interest in the services and music of the local church brought him to the attention of the prior of a nearby abbey of Premonstrants. Through him, Haüy was introduced to a colleague in Paris and obtained a scholarship to the College of Navarre. Haüy eventually became an usher, and in 1764, was appointed regent (master) of the fourth class.

Haüy also progressed in his religious training. He was tonsured in 1762, took minor orders in 1765, was appointed a subdeacon in 1767, became a deacon in 1769, and was ordained as a Roman Catholic priest in 1770.

After his ordination, Haüy became regent (teacher) of the second class at the Collège du Cardinal-Lemoine.
Through his friendship with his spiritual director, Abbé Lhomond, Haüy became interested first in botany, and after hearing a lecture by Louis-Jean-Marie Daubenton, in mineralogy.

His brother Valentin Haüy was the founder of the first school for the blind, the Institution des Jeunes Aveugles (Institute for Blind Youth) in Paris.

Crystallography

An accident apparently directed René-Just Haüy's attention to what became a new field in natural history, crystallography. Haüy was examining a broken specimen of calcareous spar in the collection of Jacques de France de Croisset. (According to some accounts, Haüy dropped the specimen and caused it to break.) He became intrigued by the perfectly smooth plane of the fracture.

Studying the fragments inspired Haüy to make further experiments in crystal cutting. Breaking down crystals to the smallest pieces possible, Haüy concluded that each type of crystal has a fundamental primitive, nucleus or “integrant molecule” of a particular shape, that could not be broken further without destroying both the physical and chemical nature of the crystal. He further argued that crystal structures are made up of orderly arrangements of these integrant molecules in successive layers, according to geometrical laws of crystallization. 
Crystals that had been classed together previously were identified as being of separate mineral species if their fundamental structure differed. Heavyspar, for example, was differentiated into specimens containing barium and strontium. 
The value of Haüy's discovery was immediately recognized.

Haüy and his contemporaries worked with limited evidence.  They could observe a crystal's habit and  cleavage planes and measure interfacial angles with an instrument called a goniometer. The internal structure underlying the crystal's integrant molecule would not be determinable until the development of X-Ray diffraction technology many years later, in 1902. 
Haüy was not the only researcher to observe that calcite crystals could be composed of smaller rhombohedra, but it was he who introduced the idea of triple periodicity in crystals.

This idea was fundamental to later developments in the field on crystal lattices.

Between 1784 and 1822, Haüy published more than 100 reports discussing his theories and their application to the structure of crystalline substances.
Haüy first stated his laws of decrement in Essai d'une théorie sur la structure des crystaux (1784). It was a radical departure from his previous works, introducing his theory of molé constituantes or constituent molecules.
By 1792, he had identified a number  of parallelepipeds as possible primitive crystal forms.
Haüy worked out the mathematical theory of his work in his Traité de minéralogie (1801), which became a classic in the field. By then, Haüy had applied his ideas to the differentiation of different species. He systematically described all the known minerals, sorting them into classes, and giving their chemical and geometrical properties. His work, in four volumes, including an atlas of plates, was accounted among the most wonderful of the 19th century. It has been described as "a work of comprehensive insight, and much of it, written with literary fluency".  A second updated edition appeared as Traité de cristallographie in 1822.

Haüy created comprehensive collections containing hundreds of pear-wood models of crystal models for education and demonstrations. One such set was acquired by Martin van Marum, curator of the Teylers Museum and a director of the Hollandsche Maatschappij der Wetenschappen.

Haüy is also known for his observations on pyroelectricity.  He detected pyroelectricity in calamine, an oxide of zinc, as early as 1785. 
He studied pyroelectricity in a number of other minerals including tourmaline and related them to crystalline structure.
He showed that electricity in tourmaline was strongest at the poles of the crystal and became imperceptible at the middle.
Haüy published a book on electricity and magnetism, Exposition raisonné de la théorie de l'électricité et du magnétisme, d'après les principes d'Æpinus, in 1787.

On February 12, 1783, Haüy was elected to the Académie royale des sciences de Paris (French Academy of Sciences) with the rank of an adjoint in botany, there being no vacancy in either physics or mineralogy.  In 1788, he became as an associate in natural history and mineralogy.

French Revolution

During the French Revolution, Haüy refused to take an oath accepting the Civil Constitution of the Clergy, and became a non-juring priest. He was thrown into prison after the monarchy was overthrown on August 10, 1792.  Étienne Geoffroy Saint-Hilaire interceded on his behalf. Haüy was released just a few days before the September Massacres of September  2–7, 1792 in which many of the clergy were killed.

On August 8, 1793, in spite of the efforts of Antoine Lavoisier, the Académie royale des sciences de Paris was dissolved by the National Convention. It was not restored until August 22, 1795, when it became known as the Institut National des Sciences et des Arts (National Institute of Sciences and Arts).

Before its suppression, the Academy of Sciences had formed a  working group to develop a uniform system of weights and measures for use throughout France.  Lavoisier was a major proponent, and on March 30, 1791, he submitted a plan on behalf of the Commission on Weights and Measures, which was adopted by the Constituent Assembly. Lavoisier and Haüy were tasked with determining the density of water. As of January 4, 1793, they determined the weight of a cubic decimeter of distilled water at the temperature of melting ice, the kilogram.

On August 1, 1793, the National Convention passed a decree, in favor of developing uniform weights and measures across France. On September 11, 1793, they established a Temporary Commission of Weights and Measures made up of twelve scientists, including Haüy, whose task was to carry out the decree. 
  
The work of the commission was disrupted by political events. In November 1793, Lavoisier and several others were arrested and removed from the Commission. On May 8, 1794 Lavoisier was guillotined.
Nonetheless, Haüy remained secretary of the Commission through this turmoil.
The law of 18 Germinal an III was enacted on April 7, 1795, formally establishing the metric system in France.

On July 12, 1794, a public decree reorganized the École des Mines (School of Mines) in Paris and specified the establishment of a Cabinet of Mineralogy, a collection of all Earth materials. In October 1794, René Just Haüy was appointed the first curator of the Cabinet of Mineralogy, later known as the Musée de Minéralogie. He may therefore be considered a founder of the Musée de Minéralogie.

On November 9, 1794, Haüy also became a professor of physics at the École normale supérieure.
In 1802, Haüy became a professor of mineralogy at the Muséum national d'Histoire naturelle (National Museum of Natural History).

Haüy's work was appreciated by  Napoleon, who made Haüy an Honorary Canon of the Eglise Métropolitain de Paris (Notre Dame) on April 5, 1802.
On November 28, 1803, Haüy became one of the first recipients of the Order of the Légion d'Honneur. 
Napoleon encouraged Haüy to write Traité élémentaire de physique (1803), and is reported to have read it during his incarceration on Elba in 1814.
During his brief return to power in 1815, Napoleon promoted Haüy to officer of the  Légion d'Honneur.

After 1814 Haüy was deprived of his appointments by the Restoration government. He spent his final days in poverty, dying in Paris on June 1, 1822 even if "June 3" is systematically reported. The confusion in Haüy's death date (June 1 instead of June 3) is an 1823 error by Cuvier, rectified in 1944 by A. Lacroix but still often misreported.

Recognition

In 1817, René-Just Haüy was elected an honorary member of the New York Academy of Sciences.
In 1821, Haüy was elected a foreign member of the Royal Swedish Academy of Sciences.

His name is the thirteenth inscribed on the south-east side of the Eiffel Tower.

The mineral Haüyne was named for Haüy in 1807 by Thomas-Christophe Bruun-Neergaard. It occurs in silica-deficient igneous rocks in a wide variety of locations.

The International Mineralogical Association declared 2022 the International Year of Mineralogy which will take place under the patronage of the International Year of Basic Science for Sustainable Development and has been approved by UNESCO in regard of the 200 anniversary of the death of René-Just Haüy, at the Hôtel de Magny of the Jardin des plantes (MNHN), in Paris (France). There, several events were scheduled to honor René-Just Haüy:

 the exhibition "Pierres précieuses" (Gems) at the Jardin des plantes (2020-2021) celebrated a tribute to Haüy with a third section devoted by François Farges, co-curator, to René-Just Haüy and, among others, his gems; 
 a symposium and two exhibitions around René-Just Haüy were inaugurated on June 3rd 2022 by IMPMC in between the Jussieu and Jardin des Plantes campuses;
 a new website (French/English) - Haüy 2022 - was  created by François Farges that exhibits for the first time many aspects of the life, work and collections of Haüy kept mostly at the MNHN in Paris with many new discoveries made by various researchers, mostly in Paris, 78 years after the previous commemoration at the French MNHN in 1944.
 many life and work updates (in French) : Farges, François; Kjellman, Johan, Bicentenaire de la disparition de René-Just Haüy... Le Règne Minéral 165, pp. 7-42 (2022).

Works

The following are Haüy's principal works:

Essai d'une théorie sur la structure des crystaux (1784) via Gallica
 
De la structure considérée comme caractère distinctif des minéraux (1793)
Exposition abrégé de la théorie de la structure des cristaux (1793) BNF
Extrait d'un traité élémentaire de minéralogie (1797)
Traité de minéralogie (5 vols, 1801) BNF: Vol 1 Vol 2 Vol 3 Vol 4 Vol 5
Traité élémentaire de physique (2 vols 1803, 1806) Google Books
Tableau comparatif des résultats de la cristallographie, et de l'analyse chimique relativement à la classification des minéraux (1809) BNF
Traité des pierres précieuses (1817) BNF
Traité de cristallographie  (2 vols, 1822) Google Books

He also contributed papers, of which 100 are enumerated in the Royal Society's catalogue, to various scientific journals, especially the Journal de physique and the Annales du Museum d'Histoire Naturelle.

See also
Centered octahedral number
List of Roman Catholic scientist-clerics

References

External links
 
 Catholic Encyclopedia 1917
 George F. Kunz. “The Life and Work of Haüy.” American Mineralogist.  Volume 3, number 6, 1918. Pages 61–89, plates 5–11; Also: Bulletin of the New York Mineralogical Club.  Volume 3, pages 61–89, plates 5–11 [sic]. This was for the celebration of the 175th anniversary of the birth of the famous French mineralogist.
 François Farges, Haüy 2022.

1743 births
1822 deaths
People from Oise
Burials at Père Lachaise Cemetery
Foreign Members of the Royal Society
French mineralogists
Members of the French Academy of Sciences
Members of the Koninklijke Hollandsche Maatschappij der Wetenschappen
Members of the Royal Swedish Academy of Sciences
Catholic clergy scientists
University of Paris alumni